Herbert Morris was a rower.

Herbert Morris may also refer to:

Herbert Stanley Morris (1892–1919), botanist
Herbert Morris (philosopher) (born 1928), American philosopher
Herb Morris, actor in Just Rambling Along

See also

Bert Morris (disambiguation)